Goat is the second full-length studio album by The Jesus Lizard, released in 1991. The album was produced by Steve Albini.

Its cover art, by bassist David Wm. Sims, at first glance resembles a flame, but is actually a topless woman with a close-up image of nails projected onto her body. The rear of the album, and several panels of  the enclosed CD booklet include similar pictures of the same naked woman, with different images projected onto her body. It was ranked as the 38th best album of the 1990s by the online magazine Pitchfork.

Track listing

Personnel
David Yow – vocals
Duane Denison – guitar
David Wm. Sims – bass
Mac McNeilly – drums

References

External links
 List of microphones used on blog of bassist David Wm. Sims

1991 albums
The Jesus Lizard albums
Touch and Go Records albums
Albums produced by Steve Albini